Henry Knaggs may refer to:

 Henry Guard Knaggs (1832–1908), English entomologist
 Henry Valentine Knaggs (1859–1954), English doctor and author